Voškoniai is a village in the Kaunas district municipality, Lithuania. Eigirgala library, established in 1953, is in Voškoniai. According to the 2011 census, the village had 880 residents.

Notable residents 

 Bolesław Gościewicz

References 

Villages in Kaunas County